is a Japanese light novel series by Daisuke Suzuki, with illustrations by Kyōrin Takanae. The light novel started serialization in Monthly Dragon Magazine in April 2005, published by Fujimi Shobo. A manga adaptation was serialized in the shōnen manga magazine Monthly Dragon Age. An anime adaptation by AIC Spirits first aired in Japan on October 4, 2007. Two radio dramas for the series have been broadcast.

Plot
Shungo Ninomiya, a high school guy, lives in a large house with his older sister Ryōko, who works as a mercenary. One day, Ryōko sends her siblings Mayu and Mikihiro Tsukimura to live with them. Mayu's goal is to overcome her fear of men and to control her powers, however, she is a young succubus, a creature that naturally attracts men. Ryōko and Mikihiro have Mayu and Shungo share everything from the same room to the same bed. Making things more awkward, Shungo's jealous childhood friend, student council president Reika Hōjō, joins the household as a maid.

Characters

, Ayahi Takagaki (young), Takuma Terashima (first radio drama)
Shungo, the title character, is a high school guy who trains in martial arts. He often shows self-restraint from his female schoolmates, who enjoy flirting with and teasing him. He and Reika are childhood friends, but he is put in a situation where he must host and live together with Mayu.

, Umeka Shouji (young), Yuko Goto (first radio drama)
Mayu is a succubus who is sent to live with Shungo to practice getting over her fear of men. Because she cannot control her powers, she naturally attracts men as if they were zombies, and knocks them out with her power when they get too close. Her clumsiness and ditzy personality often get her in embarrassing situations such as spraying herself with water while wearing a tight white shirt or frequently falling on top of Shungo. However, she is sometimes lucky in getting out of dangerous situations, as demonstrated in the remote island storyline. She wears bat-wing hair clips. It is later revealed that she, Reika, and Shungo have known each other as childhood friends.
 
, Yuki Matsuoka (first radio drama)
Reika is the student council president at Shungo's school, and an heiress to a large conglomerate called the Houjou Group. She acts proud and haughty, and bothers Shungo regularly. However, after being filmed in an embarrassing video where she fails to seduce Shungo, she agrees to become Shungo's maid and lives with him. It is later revealed that she is a succubus who harbors a dark and serious alternate personality that occasionally manifests, as well as a past childhood relationship with Shungo. In the anime, she is involved in many of the Houjou Group's businesses including influencing national policies, meeting with dignitaries, and creating corporate products. In the anime, her alternate personality tries to take Shungo for herself.

, Naomi Shindou (first radio drama)
Shungo's older sister works as a mercenary. In the anime, she joins the school staff as a nurse. She carries a camcorder and director's megaphone where she films and directs Mayu in roleplaying situations where she has to romantically interact with Shungo.

, Daisuke Hirakawa (first radio drama)
Mikihiro is Mayu's older brother. He is an incubus, the male counterpart of a succubus. He enjoys manipulating Reika and others to do what he wants. He and Ryōko are long-time friends, as they are often seen working together, even in flashbacks. In the anime episode where Shungo searches for ramen ingredients, Mikihiro happens to own the related businesses: a wheat farm, an animal ranch, and a fishing boat.

, Yuka Inokuchi (first radio drama)
Mitsuru is a senior student to Shungo, and Reika's main assistant both at school and at home. He has martial arts abilities that rival Shungo's.

Kirishima is the head maid for Reika's family. She carries a wakizashi sword, ready to execute Shungo, whom she thinks is not worthy of Reika. She uses Japanese honorifics towards Reika, but quickly reverts to blunt speech towards Shungo. In the anime, she joins the cast after the gang spend a vacation on a private island.
 Hinako Ayakawa
 Hinako is Shungo's classmate with the short hair. She likes to tease Shungo, and later befriends Mayu.
 Irori Okushiro
 Shungo's classmate with the long green hair and glasses. She flirts with Shungo, and is later revealed to be a succubus when she kisses him  and drains his energy during the class field trip. However, she later reveals it was a ploy to win the affections of a jealous Tasuku, whom she really loves.
 Tasuku Okushiro
 Shungo's schoolmate with short green hair. He tries to interfere in Shungo and Mayu's relationship in order to get revenge from a fight many years ago, and is jealous because Irori kissed Shungo.

Media

Light novels
The series began as a light novel originally serialized in the Japanese shōnen light novel magazine Monthly Dragon Magazine in April 2005, published by Fujimi Shobo. As of September 2008, ten normal volumes under the title Goshūshō-sama Ninomiya-kun, and six smaller volumes under the title Oainiku-sama Ninomiya-kun have been published. The novels are written by Daisuke Suzuki with illustrations by Kyōrin Takanae. The series won second prize in Fujimi Shobo's Long Fantasy Novel Contest.

Radio dramas
There have been two radio dramas for the series. The first, containing five broadcasts, aired between June 25, 2006, and July 23, 2006, and was a part of the Fujimi TeenAge Fun Club. These broadcasts were later compiled into a drama CD in December 2006. The second radio drama began on October 7, 2007, on the same station. The voices in the second radio drama are from the voice actors from the anime version, but the voices in the first broadcast were from different voice actors.

Manga
A manga adaptation, illustrated by Haiji Suzuro and Reiji Hamada, began serialization in Fujimi Shobo's shōnen manga magazine Monthly Dragon Age in early 2007. The first bound volume was released in October 2007, and the second was released in January 2008.

Anime
An anime adaptation by the animation studio AIC Spirits first aired in Japan on October 4, 2007, and ended on December 20, 2007, containing twelve episodes. The anime was licensed for release in English by Kadokawa USA, but its Kadokawa Pictures USA subsidiary later closed down, therefore canceling the release. Starting December 15, 2010, Crunchyroll released English subtitled episodes of the series under the title Good Luck! Ninomiya-kun. Episodes were released weekly in sets of three to the public, with the final three episodes being released on January 5, 2011.

Reception

Stig Høgset of THEM Anime Reviews was critical of the anime series stating, "Basically, if you're passing by this show looking for some good, saucy fun, then keep looking. There's nothing to see here."

References

External links
 at Fujimi Shobo 

2004 Japanese novels
2007 manga
Anime and manga based on light novels
Anime International Company
Fujimi Fantasia Bunko
Fujimi Shobo manga
Kadokawa Dwango franchises
Funimation
Light novels
Romantic comedy anime and manga
Shōnen manga